The Biggest Winner Arab (season 1) is the second season of the Arabic version of the original NBC American reality television series The Biggest Loser. The second season premiered on April 26, 2006.

Contestants 

Teams
 Member of Zaina's Team
 Member of Hani's Team
Winners
 250,000 SAR.  Winner (among the finalists)
 50,000 SAR.  Winner (among the eliminated contestants)

Lebanese television series
2006 Lebanese television seasons
2000s Lebanese television series